is a private university in Uenohara, Yamanashi, Japan. It was established in 1990 as the Nishi Tokyo University of Science and renamed Teikyo University of Science in April 1996.

References

External links
 Official website 

Educational institutions established in 1990
Private universities and colleges in Japan
Universities and colleges in Yamanashi Prefecture
Uenohara, Yamanashi
1990 establishments in Japan